Nicolas Devilder was the defending champion, but he chose to not participate this year.
Blaž Kavčič won in the final 3–6, 6–3, 6–4, against Julian Reister.

Seeds

Draw

Final four

Top half

Bottom half

References
 Main Draw
 Qualifying Draw

Mamaia Challenger - Singles